Country Hall of Fame is a studio album by American country music singer–songwriter Hank Locklin. It was released in 1978 via Top Spin Records and contained a total of 12 tracks. The album featured new songs and re-recordings of material previously cut by Locklin.

Background, content and release
Hank Locklin had his biggest commercial success in the 1950s and 1960s with songs like "Send Me the Pillow You Dream On" and "Please Help Me, I'm Falling." These songs (among others) gained notable popularity overseas, particularly in Europe and Japan. After Locklin's commercial success declined in the 1970s, he began touring more internationally. He remained a popular concert attraction in Ireland specifically. 

Country Hall of Fame was recorded during this period and was tailored specifically for the Irish music market. It was recorded at Big Tom's Studios, located in Castleblayney, Ireland. The sessions were produced by Basil Hendricks. The project contained 12 tracks. Most of the album's material were re-recordings of songs previously made successful by Locklin. Covers included "Please Help Me, I'm Falling," "Irish Eyes" and "The Country Hall of Fame." New material included "Country Girl Star" and "Green, White and Gold."

Country Hall of Fame was released in 1978 via Top Spin Records. It was the twenty sixth studio album release of Locklin's music career and his first with the Top Spin label. The project was originally issued as a vinyl LP, containing six songs on either side. In later years, it was released for other markets in a digital and streaming format.

Track listings

Vinyl version

Digital version

Release history

References

1978 albums
Hank Locklin albums